Nikhil Nandy (1932 – 29 December 2020) was an Indian footballer. He competed in the men's tournament at the 1956 Summer Olympics. As an octogenarian, he was still engaged in coaching youngsters in Kolkata, India. He was part of Eastern Railway's historic Calcutta Football League win in 1958.

Honours

Eastern Railway
 Calcutta Football League: 1958

Bengal
 Santosh Trophy: 1955–56

References

External links
 
 

1932 births
2020 deaths
Indian footballers
India international footballers
Olympic footballers of India
Footballers at the 1956 Summer Olympics
Footballers from Kolkata
Association football forwards
Indian football coaches
Association football coaches
Calcutta Football League players
Deaths from the COVID-19 pandemic in India
Footballers at the 1958 Asian Games
Asian Games competitors for India